Entertainment media may refer to:

 Entertainment
 Mass media

See also
 Media (communication)